Dayr Nakhkhas (Deir Nakh-khâs) was a Palestinian Arab village located 20 km northwest of Hebron, overlooking Wadi Bayt Jibrin to the north.

Location
Dayr Nakkhas was situated on the road to Hebron about two miles east of Bayt Jibrin. Perched on a hill, an open corn valley lay below the village. Located in an area rich in archaeological sites, in the land area that belonged to the village, there were some 15 sites, including the village itself (which was built on an earlier ancient site).

History
During the Crusader era it was known as Deir Nachar, and it was a casale under the Knights Hospitallers. This was confirmed in 1136, by  the King of Jerusalem, Fulk.

Ottoman era
In a 1596 census for the Ottoman Empire, it is recorded that Dayr Nakhkhas was part of nahiya (subdistrict) of Halil [i.e. al-Khalil, or Hebron], under the liwa' (district) of Jerusalem, with a population of 13 Muslim households; an estimated 72 persons.  The inhabitants paid taxes on a number of crops, including wheat, barley, olives, as well as on goats and  beehives; a total of 4,000  akçe.

In 1863 Victor Guérin noted about the village: "This village is located on a mountain whose flanks were once exploited as quarries. The lower part of some houses are made with beautiful antique stones. A very deep well, partly built and partly dug out of the rock, is also dated from antiquity. On the slopes of the hill, where the village occupies the summit, grows olive and fig trees; here and there are also a number of artificial caverns which once served as dwellings or storehouses."

I  the  PEF's Survey of Western Palestine (SWP) the name of the village is transcribed, "Deir Nakhkhâs", and translated as, "the monastery of the cattle drover.

In 1883, SWP described it as; "A very small village perched on a high, steep hill, looking down on the valley to the north. "This is possibly Ir-Nahash (i Chronicles iv. 12)."
It is also said to contain, "A ruined birkeh and a cave with 250 niches."

British Mandate era
In the 1922 census of Palestine conducted  by the British Mandate authorities, Deir Nakhas had a population of 336 inhabitants, all Muslims, increasing in  the 1931 census to 451, still all Muslim, in a total of  86 inhabited houses.

The village was rectangular in layout, with houses built of stone, expanding along and towards the road linking it to Hebron. The children attended  schools in the neighbouring villages.

By the  1945 statistics, the population was recorded at 600 Muslims. In the 1944/45 growing season, a total of 4,887 dunums of village land was planted in cereals; 362 dunums were irrigated or used for orchards, while 22 dunams were built-up (urban) land.

1948, and aftermath
During the 1948 Arab-Israeli war, Dayr Nakhkhas was defended by the Egyptian Army. The village was depopulated as a result of a military assault by Israeli forces on October 29, 1948.

Following the war the area was incorporated into the State of Israel. The land that had belonged to Dayr Nakhkhas was left undeveloped; the Palestinian historian Walid Khalidi described the village land in 1992: "Nothing remains of the village except a few deserted houses and the rubble of others. One deserted house is made of concrete and has rectangular windows and a flat roof. It is marked with Arabis graffiti and stands in the midst of tall wild grasses and weeds. There is a fenced-in cave. The surrounding land is cultivated by Israeli farmers."

Gallery

References

Bibliography

External links
Welcome To Dayr Nakhkhas
Dayr Nakhkhas, Zochrot
Survey of Western Palestine, Map 20: IAA,   Wikimedia commons
Dayr Nakhas from the Khalil Sakakini Cultural Center

Arab villages depopulated during the 1948 Arab–Israeli War
District of Hebron